Rye Hills Academy (formerly Rye Hills School) is a coeducational secondary school located in Redcar in North Yorkshire, England.

The school is on Redcar Lane (B1269) just east of Redcar Racecourse at the junction with Warwick Road. Redcar East railway station is nearby to the north-east. Redcar & Cleveland College had their Connections Campus a little further south along Redcar Lane.

History

Grammar school
Saltburn High School for Girls opened on Marske Road in Saltburn-by-the-Sea. Cleveland Grammar School, its successor, was on Warwick Road, which opened in September 1953 for 500 girls, run by the Teesside Education Committee, based in Middlesbrough. By the early 1960s there were 600 girls, and 900 by 1969. It was sometimes known as Cleveland Grammar School for Girls. The male equivalent was Sir William Turner's Grammar School.

Comprehensive
The school originally opened in 1975 as a merger of two neighbouring schools, Redcar Lane Secondary Modern (always called "Warwick Road") and Cleveland Grammar School, a girls' school. The new first year pupils of 1975/6 were the first intake under the comprehensive system. The school lost its sixth form.

The first headmistress was Patricia Rutherford, the first deputy head was Geoff Curtis. The current headmistress is Caroline Waugh.

In March 1995, a 14-year-old boy died after having a heart defect and collapsing during a PE session.

The school was demolished and rebuilt on the same site in 2001. The £7.7 million new building was opened by Tony Blair in November 2001.

In April 2001, it was announced that along with 114 other schools, Rye Hills was accepted onto the government's trust school programme and they will work towards that status.

Academy
Previously a foundation school administered by Redcar and Cleveland Borough Council, in March 2017 Rye Hills School converted to academy status and was renamed Rye Hills Academy. The school is now sponsored by the Nunthorpe Multi Academy Trust.

Notable former staff and pupils
Danny Nightingale, an Olympic gold medal winner, was a PE teacher.

Danny Hart, a UCI DH MTB world cup winner and world champion attended the school.

Singer-songwriter James Arthur also attended the school.

References

External links
 Rye Hills Academy
 EduBase

Educational institutions established in 1975
Secondary schools in Redcar and Cleveland
1975 establishments in England
Academies in Redcar and Cleveland
Redcar